Alireza Firouzja (born 18 June 2003) is an Iranian and French chess grandmaster. Firouzja is the youngest-ever 2800-rated player, beating the previous record set by Magnus Carlsen by more than five months.

A chess prodigy, Firouzja won the Iranian Chess Championship at age 12 and earned the Grandmaster title at 14. At 16, Firouzja became the second-youngest 2700-rated player and won a silver medal at the 2019 World Rapid Chess Championship. In November 2021, at 18, he won the FIDE Grand Swiss tournament and an individual gold medal at the European Team Chess Championship. He won a bronze medal at the 2021 World Blitz Chess Championship. In 2022, Firouzja won the Grand Chess Tour.

Firouzja left the Iranian Chess Federation in 2019 because of the country's longstanding policy against competing with Israeli players. He played under the FIDE flag until mid-2021, when he became a French citizen and began representing France, where he had already been living.

Early life
Firouzja was born on 18 June 2003 in Babol, Iran. He started playing chess at the age of eight. He has an older brother, Mohammadreza, born in 1998, who also plays competitive chess.

Chess career

20152017
Firouzja won the gold medal in the U12 section at the Asian Youth Chess Championships held in 2015 in Suwon. In adult tournaments, one of Firouzja's earliest successes was in the 10th Nana Aleksandria Cup in 2015, held in Georgia. In a strong field with 15 grandmasters, Firouzja finished with 5/9, including a victory against grandmaster Vugar Rasulov and four draws against four other grandmasters. He had further successes in the Iranian chess championship semi-final, an unbeaten 7/9 (+5-0=4), which served as a qualifier to the main championship held the following year. He then took part in the strongest open tournament held that year, the Qatar Masters 2015, in which he scored 4½/9, including victories against grandmasters Pavel Tregubov and Neelotpal Das.

At the age of twelve, he won the 2016 Iranian Chess Championship, scoring 8/11 points (+5−0=6), a full point ahead of his nearest competitors, and became the youngest ever to win the title.

These results in the Iranian championship semi-finals, the Qatar Masters and the Iranian championship increased Firouzja's rating to 2475 at age 12 years and 7 months.

Later that year, he played in the Asian Nations Cup for Iran in which he scored 5½/7 on board 4 and a notable draw against grandmaster Wei Yi, who was at that time the youngest supergrandmaster in the world. Firouzja then experienced some negative results.

In August 2016, the Iranian chess federation scheduled a match between 13-year–old Firouzja (2485 FIDE) and then 16-year-old Parham Maghsoodloo (2510 FIDE). Firouzja lost all three games.

Firouzja played in the Stars Cup 2016, an initiative by the Iranian chess federation which pitted the nation's established top players and its new wave of rising stars against some of the strongest grandmasters in the world. Featuring such notable players as Nigel Short, Evgenij Miroshnichenko, Gabriel Sargissian, Aleksey Dreev, Romain Édouard, Ivan Sokolov, Lu Shanglei, and Jaan Ehlvest, it was Firouzja's first major test against such calibre of opposition and he scored 2/10, though he did score a victory over Miroshnichenko. Firouzja also played in his first Olympiad for Iran on the fourth board and finished with 4½/8.

Also in 2016, he was awarded the title International Master (IM) by FIDE.

In February 2017, Firouzja finished tied for 3rd place (6/9) in the Khazar cup, behind the winner, Ferenc Berkes. In April 2017, Firouzja had his best performance to date when he scored 6/9 in the Aeroflot Open 2017, a tournament of about 80 grandmasters, including several players in the top 100. There, he scored victories over German grandmasters Alexander Donchenko, Matthias Blübaum and Falko Bindrich and also beat grandmasters Emilio Córdova and Maxim Vavulin.

In June 2017, he had a 7/9 performance at the Asian Junior U20 Championship. This result took him over the 2500 rating threshold for the first time. Later that year, the 2nd Stars cup tournament took place in Iran, again with an impressive list of foreign grandmasters: Baadur Jobava, Loek Van Wely, Alexei Shirov, Lázaro Bruzón Batista, Eltaj Safarli and Ivan Sokolov. Firouzja scored 3½/6 (+2-1=3), beating Jobava and Van Wely. His victory over Jobava was particularly notable as it was 13-year–old Firouzja's first victory over a supergrandmaster (Jobava was rated 2714 at the time).

2018
In January 2018, he had a string of impressive results in the Iranian chess championship semi-final (7½/9) and the World Youth U16 Chess Olympiad (8/9), which increased his rating to 2549.

In February 2018, he participated in the Aeroflot Open. He finished 40th out of 92, scoring 4½/9 points (+2−2=5), earning his final norm required for the title Grandmaster (GM) in the process. He was awarded the GM title by FIDE in April 2018.

Firouzja took part in the Malaysian Open 2018 in August 2018 in which he tied for 2nd place behind winner Wang Hao. In the same month, he took part in the World Junior Chess Championship held in Gebze, Turkey, finishing with 7½/11.

In July, Firouzja represented Iran at the Asian Nations Cup, held in Hamadan. Iran won all three open events, and Firouzja was the top individual performer in the classical event with 6/7.

At the 43rd Chess Olympiad, he played on the fourth board, scoring 8/11 (+6−1=4).

He won individual gold at the World Youth U16 Chess Olympiad, held from 25 November to 2 December, with a score of 8/9 points (+7−0=2; 2736 performance rating).

At the 2018 World Rapid Championship held in Saint Petersburg, Firouzja finished sixth in a field of world-class players, behind Daniil Dubov, Shakhriyar Mamedyarov, Hikaru Nakamura, Vladislav Artemiev and Magnus Carlsen. Starting as the 169th seed in a tournament of 206 participants, Firouzja scored 10/15 (+8−3=4) with a performance rating of 2848, the second-highest in the event behind winner Dubov. At the World Blitz Championship, he placed 42nd out of 150 with a score of 12/21 (+10−7=4). He led the field by a clear point after 7 rounds with 6½/7, but his form faltered after losing to the eventual winner Carlsen in round 8.

2019
2019 was a significant year for Firouzja as he managed to make a rating leap from 2618 in January to 2723 in December. Firouzja won the Iranian Chess Championship for a second time in 2019, finishing in clear first with 9/11 (+7−0=4).

A string of impressive results would follow. In February, Firouzja took clear 1st place, with 7½/9, in the strong Fajr Cup held in Tehran, Iran, ahead of notable grandmasters such as Pavel Ponkratov, Sergey Volkov, Yuriy Kuzubov, Sergey Fedorchuk, and the best Iranian player of the previous generation, Ehsan Ghaem Maghami. Later that month, he played in his third Stars Cup. This time it had a reduced field of four grandmasters: Safarli, Tiviakov, Bosiocic and Alekseev. It was played in a double round-robin format. Firouzja finished undefeated (+3-0=5).

In March, he competed in the World Team Chess Championship with Iran. He scored 7/9 points (+6−1=2), and Iran placed sixth out of ten. This series of consecutive results increased his rating to 2657 in the April 2019 rating list and he broke into the world top 100.

Later in May, he participated in the 3rd Sharjah Masters. He tied for 1st–7th on 7/9 (+5−0=4), placing fourth on tiebreak. Ernesto Inarkiev won the event. In April, Firouzja competed in the Chess.com Bullet Chess Championship, losing in the quarterfinals to the eventual winner Hikaru Nakamura. Later in April, Firouzja placed second on tiebreak behind Constantin Lupulescu in the Reykjavik Open with 7/9 (+6−1=2). During the event's rest day, he won the European Fischer Random Championship with 8/9 (+7−0=2).

Firouzja competed in the Grenke Chess Open, held from 18 to 22 April. He won his first two games but refused to play against the Israeli FIDE Master Or Bronstein in the third round, thus forfeiting the game. This was in line with Iranian government policy, as Iran does not recognise the state of Israel and sanctions players who compete against Israelis. Firouzja then lost in the fourth round to 1945-rated Antonia Ziegenfuss. He won his remaining five games to place 27th with 7/9. In May, Firouzja faced Peruvian grandmaster José Martinez-Alcantara in round one of the 2019 Junior Speed Chess Championship, an online blitz and bullet competition hosted by Chess.com. Firouzja won the match with an overall score of 18–7. Later in May, he competed in the French Rapid and Blitz Championships, held in Le Blanc-Mesnil. He won the rapid event by defeating Alberto David in the final.

In June, Firouzja took part in the 18th edition of the Asian Chess Championship, held from 6 to 16 June in Xingtai. He finished the tournament in sixth place with 6/9 points (+5−2=2). Though only the top five were set to qualify for the Chess World Cup 2019, Firouzja narrowly qualified for a spot in the World Cup as 1st-placed Lê Quang Liêm and 5th-placed Rinat Jumabayev had already qualified in previous events. He later finished fourth in a Blitz event held on the final day of the tournament with 6½/9 pts (+6−2=1).

Firouzja represented Tatvan in the Turkish Super League from 17 to 28 July. He scored 11½/13 (+10–0=3), thus increasing his rating to 2702. This made Firouzja the first Iranian to reach a rating of 2700 or above. It also made him the youngest player in the world rated 2700 or more, and the second youngest player in history (after Wei Yi) to achieve that feat.

At the FIDE World Cup in September, Firouzja defeated Arman Pashikian in round one and Daniil Dubov in round two. This made Firouzja the first Iranian player to reach the third round of a Chess World Cup. In round three, he faced the number-one seed Ding Liren. Firouzja drew with Ding in the two classical games, but lost both of the rapid tiebreakers and was eliminated from the tournament.

On 27 December, Firouzja announced that he would no longer play under the Iran chess federation after Iran withdrew its players from the 2019 World Rapid and Blitz Championship to uphold their ban against Iranians playing against Israelis. He instead competed as a FIDE-licensed competitor. Firouzja competed in the World Rapid Chess Championship from 26 to 28 December. He finished the tournament as runner-up with 10½/15 (+8–2=5), one point short of winner Magnus Carlsen. He was the first-ever Iranian-born grandmaster to go on a podium in the history of the competition. At the World Blitz Chess Championship held from 29 to 30 December, Firouzja placed sixth with 13½/21 (+12–6=3).

2020
Firouzja participated in the Tata Steel Chess Tournament in January. He became the first Iranian to compete in the Masters' bracket of the tournament; Parham Maghsoodloo had previously competed in the 2019 Tata Steel Challengers. This was the first time that Firouzja faced the world elite in a classical round-robin tournament, and he said in an interview that his expectations were not oriented towards winning the event, but gaining more experience at the top level. He finished with 6½/13 (+4–4=5), placing ninth.

In February, Firouzja competed in the Masters section of the Prague International Chess Festival, a 10-player category XIX round-robin event, as a late replacement for Wei Yi, who could not attend due to the COVID-19 pandemic. After a tie for first–fifth on 5/9, Firouzja won the tournament with a 2–0 blitz tiebreak victory over Vidit Gujrathi, giving him his first "supertournament" victory.

On 15 April, Firouzja faced Magnus Carlsen in the final of the Chess24 Banter Blitz Cup and won 8½–7½. Firouzja then competed in the Magnus Carlsen Invitational, a rapid tournament held by Chess24 from 18 April to 3 May, along with Carlsen and six other top players. Carlsen defeated Firouzja in their match by a score of 2½–1½. Firouzja placed sixth overall and did not advance to the four-way playoff.

In October, Firouzja participated in the annual Norway Chess supertournament, in Stavanger. The tournament was held with a football scoring system (3 points for a win, 1 point for a draw and 0 points for a loss). In the case of a draw, players played an armageddon game for an additional 1/2 point. Firouzja finished in second place, behind World Champion Magnus Carlsen and ahead of Levon Aronian, Fabiano Caruana and Jan-Krzysztof Duda. By the standard scoring method, Firouzja's score of 4 victories, 1 loss and 5 draws would have been enough to tie for 1st place, but Carlsen's extra points from wins in the armageddon segment relegated Firouzja to second place. His performance rating for the event was 2880.

2021 
Firouzja participated in the 83rd Tata Steel Masters in January. Going into the final round of the tournament, Firouzja had the chance to tie for first with a win in his final game. However, due to the tournament's tiebreaker rules, he would be unable to compete for first place even if he finished with the same number of points as the tournament's leaders. In his final round matchup against Radosław Wojtaszek, the arbiters suggested mid-game that the two move to a different table, irritating Firouzja. The situation generated controversy and the event organizers ultimately apologized. The game ultimately ended in a draw, and Firouzja placed fifth in the tournament with a score of 8/13 (+4-1=8), level with Andrey Esipenko and Fabiano Caruana on points who finished third and fourth, respectively. He had a 2806 TPR for the event and went up to number 13 in the world rankings.

In June Firouzja participated in the Paris Rapid and Blitz, part of the Grand Chess Tour. He performed poorly in the rapid, scoring 7/18, but scored 11/18 to finish second to Wesley So in the blitz.

Firouzja applied for and obtained French nationality in July 2021.

He was the 8th seed at the Chess World Cup 2021, but was knocked out in the second round by Javokhir Sindarov.

In September, Firouzja finished in second place in the Norway Chess supertournament 2021 edition, behind Magnus Carlsen, but ahead of a field including World Championship challenger Ian Nepomniachtchi and former challenger Sergey Karjakin. He scored +5-2=3 in standard time control games, finishing with four consecutive wins, and moved into the world's top 10 for the first time in the October 2021 rating list (10th in October, 9th in November).

In November Firouzja participated in the 2nd FIDE Grand Swiss Tournament. Firouzja won the tournament with a score of 8/11, half a point ahead of Fabiano Caruana, thus qualifying for the Candidates Tournament 2022. He became the fourth-youngest player to qualify for a Candidates Tournament.

That same month Firouzja represented France in the European Team Chess Championship, where he scored 8/9 against grandmaster opposition for a tournament performance rating of over 3000. The two November results took his rating above 2800 for the first time, and to number 2 in the December standard ratings list. At the age of 18 years, 5 months, he became the youngest player to be rated over 2800, breaking the previous record of 18 years and 336 days held by Magnus Carlsen.

After winning the World Chess Championship 2021, Magnus Carlsen said: "If someone other than Firouzja wins the Candidates Tournament, it is unlikely that I will play the next world championship match."

From 29 to 30 December, Firouzja also participated in the World Blitz Chess Championship, where he tied for first place with Maxime Vachier-Lagrave and Jan-Krzysztof Duda, scoring 15/21 points. He finished in third place after the tiebreaks, won by Vachier-Lagrave.

2022 
In May, Firouzja participated in the Superbet Chess Classic held in Bucharest, Romania, the first leg of 2022 Grand Chess Tour. As the top seed going into the event, he finished with a -1 score with 1 win and 2 losses in the 10 player single robin super tournament, tying for 7th place with Ian Nepomniachtchi. He lost the third round to Nepomniachtchi, won the fifth round against Leinier Dominguez and lost the final round to Maxime-Vachier Lagrave, who went on to win the tournament.

From June 16 to July 5, Firouzja participated in the 2022 Candidates Tournament held in Madrid, Spain, having qualified to play by winning the Grand Swiss in 2021. He finished in sixth place, ending with a 6/14 score, winning against Richárd Rapport in round 9 and Fabiano Caruana in round 14 while losing against Caruana, Hikaru Nakamura and Nepomniachtchi (twice).

From July 18 to July 24, Firouzja participated in the Croatia GCT Rapid & Blitz where he tied 2nd overall – behind Magnus Carlsen – alongside compatriot Maxime Vachier-Lagrave with 22/36 points – earning him $27,500 and 9 GCT points for his second-place finish. Firouzja did not play in the 44th Chess Olympiad in Chennai, along with Vachier-Lagrave and Étienne Bacrot, citing exhaustion and hot weather.

From August 15 to August 21, Firouzja played in the FTX Crypto Cup as part of the Meltwater Champions Chess Tour. He finished with 15/21 points, behind first-place finisher Magnus Carlsen and tying for second alongside Praggnanandhaa on points but placing third due to tiebreak rules. His third-place finish with 15 points earned him $37,500.

From August 26 to August 30, Firouzja participated in the Saint Louis Rapid & Blitz tournament as part of the Grand Chess Tour and won first place with four rounds to spare. Firouzja finished with 26/36 points (11/18 points in the rapid section and 15/18 points in the blitz section), setting the record for the youngest player to win a Grand Chess Tour event and breaking the record for the most dominant win by being 5 points ahead of the field.

On September 11, Firouzja won the Sinquefield Cup, a 9 player round robin tournament, after defeating Ian Nepomniachtchi in a rapid tiebreak match. He finished with a score of 5/8 (+3-1=5)  and his Sinquefield cup victory in Saint Louis earned him $87,500 alongside his $100,000 bonus for winning the Grand Chess Tour with a 6.5 point lead ahead of runner-up, Wesley So.  

On September 16, Firouzja finished tied first on points, alongside Fabiano Caruana, with 6.5/9 in the Champions Showdown:Chess 9LX – a rapid chess 960 tournament. On the verge of scoring a hat-trick in Saint Louis, Firouzja eventually lost the playoff against Caruana after losing the armageddon game, stumbling into a zugzwang with the black pieces. His second-place finish earned him $31,250.

Personal life
Firouzja moved to Chartres, France in 2019 and subsequently obtained French citizenship in July 2021.

References

Notes

External links

 
 
 
 
 
 

2003 births
Living people
People from Babol
Chess grandmasters
Chess Olympiad competitors
French chess players
Iranian chess players
Iranian emigrants to France
Twitch (service) streamers
Naturalized citizens of France